Vittorio Zucca (3 October 1895 – 30 June 1943) was an Italian sprinter.

Biography
He competed at the 1920 and the 1924 Summer Olympics. Vittorio Zucca has won four time the individual national championship. On the track in the sand of a 100 meters of the Olympic Games in Antwerp in 1920, he measured Vittorio Zucca, a native of Pula, at that time part of the Kingdom of Italy. Zucca was also in Paris 1924.

Achievements

National titles
3 wins on 100 metres (1919, 1920, 1922)
1 win on 200 metres (1920)

See also
Italy at the 1924 Summer Olympics
100 metres winners of Italian Athletics Championships

References

External links
 

1895 births
1943 deaths
Athletes (track and field) at the 1920 Summer Olympics
Athletes (track and field) at the 1924 Summer Olympics
Italian male sprinters
Olympic athletes of Italy
Sportspeople from Pula
Istrian Italian people
People from Austrian Littoral
Italian Austro-Hungarians
Italian Athletics Championships winners
20th-century Italian people